Air Command is the operational arm of the Royal Australian Air Force (RAAF). It is headed by the Air Commander Australia, whose role is to manage and command the RAAF's Force Element Groups (FEGs), which contain the operational capability of the Air Force. Headquarters Air Command is located at RAAF Base Glenbrook.

Structure
Air Command consists of the following FEGs:
Air Mobility Group
Air Combat Group
Surveillance and Response Group
Combat Support Group
Air Warfare Centre
Air Force Training Group

Air Command has a critical strategic role both in peacetime and wartime. It works closely with Air Force Training Group (formerly RAAF Training Command) and the Australian Defence Force's Joint Logistics Command in developing and maintaining the nation's defence capabilities.

Commanders
The Air Commander is responsible for all operational Air Force tasks, and reports to the Chief of Air Force. The Air Commander raises, trains and sustains forces for assignment to operations under the Chief of Joint Operations (CJOPS). Similar arrangements exist with Commander Forces Command (Australian Army) and Commander Australian Fleet (Royal Australian Navy).

Air Command has undergone a number of changes since its formation in May 1942, both in name and location. The following table lists those Air Force officers who have been appointed to lead the command and its headquarters in its various incarnations.

Note: The official title of each group of commanders is listed immediately after the name of the command.

References

Air Command